Anatoly Vladimirovich Pokrovsky (21 November 1930 – 2 June 2022) was a Russian vascular surgeon.

Positions
 Chief of Vascular Surgery Department at Vishnevsky Institute of Surgery of Russian Academy of Medical Sciences
 Head of the Department of Angiology and Vascular Surgery of Russian Medical Academy for Post-Graduate Education
 Chief editor of "Angiology and vascular surgery" monthly journal (in Russian)
 President of Russian Association of Angiologists and Vascular Surgeons
 President of European Society for Vascular Surgery (in 2000)
 Honorary member of American Association for Vascular Surgery

References

1930 births
2022 deaths
Russian vascular surgeons
Physicians from Minsk
Russian people of Belarusian descent
Recipients of the Order "For Merit to the Fatherland", 2nd class
Recipients of the Order "For Merit to the Fatherland", 3rd class
Recipients of the Order "For Merit to the Fatherland", 4th class
Recipients of the USSR State Prize
State Prize of the Russian Federation laureates
Full Members of the Russian Academy of Sciences
Corresponding Members of the USSR Academy of Medical Sciences
Academicians of the Russian Academy of Medical Sciences
Soviet surgeons